The year 1789 in architecture involved some significant events.

Buildings and structures

Buildings

 The main block of the Grand Pump Room, Bath, England, is begun by Thomas Baldwin.
 Cross Bath, in Bath, England, is rebuilt by Thomas Baldwin at about this date.
 Buxton Crescent in Buxton, Derbyshire, England, designed by John Carr, is completed
 New house at Newliston near Edinburgh, Scotland, designed by Robert Adam. 
 The Moscow Gostiny Dvor is designed by Giacomo Quarenghi, the favourite architect of Catherine the Great.
 The rebuilt Prince Vladimir Church, Saint Petersburg, is completed to the designs of Ivan Starov.
 All Saints' Church, Newcastle upon Tyne, England, designed by David Stevenson, is consecrated.
 The First Methodist Church in Rhode Island is built, with a 160-foot spire.
 The octagonal Old Stordal Church in Norway, designed by the late priest Ebbe Carsten Tønder, is built.
 Congress Hall, Philadelphia, designed by Samuel Lewis, is completed as the county courthouse.
 Philosophical Hall, Philadelphia, is completed for the American Philosophical Society.
 The Boydell Shakespeare Gallery in London, designed by George Dance the Younger, is opened.
 The Piață Mică arcaded market hall in Transylvania is built.
 Duras Castle in Limburg (Belgium), designed by G. Henry, is completed.
 The Alma Plantation Sugar Mill in Pointe Coupee, Louisiana, is built.
 New peers' entrance to the Irish Houses of Parliament in Dublin, designed by James Gandon, is completed.
 The Public Library, Ladyshadow in the virtual city of Zanpo is built by Lord William de Shadow.

Births
December 8 – József Hild, Hungarian architect (died 1867)
December 20 – William Burn, pioneer of the Scottish Baronial style (died 1870)
Matthew Habershon, English architect (died 1852)

Deaths
June 14 – Tommaso Temanza, Italian Neoclassical architect and author (born 1705)
August 7 – William Edwards, Welsh Methodist minister, stonemason, architect and bridge engineer, best known for the Old Bridge, Pontypridd (born 1719)
November 28 – Friedrich August Krubsacius, German architect and architectural theoretician (born 1718)

Architecture
Years in architecture
18th-century architecture